Pasiphila humilis is a moth in the family Geometridae. It is endemic to New Zealand.

The larvae feed on the flowers of Dracophyllum species.

References

Moths described in 1917
humilis
Moths of New Zealand